WeNMR is a worldwide e-Infrastructure for NMR spectroscopy and structural biology. It is the largest virtual Organization in the life sciences and is supported by EGI.

Goals
WeNMR aims at bringing together complementary research teams in the structural biology and life science area into a virtual research community at a worldwide level and provide them with a platform integrating and streamlining the computational approaches necessary for NMR and SAXS data analysis and structural modelling. Access to the infrastructure is provided through a portal integrating commonly used software and GRID technology.

Services 
There are about 2 dozen computational NMR services available that can be divided into:

 Processing: MDD NMR
 Assignment: Auto Assign  • MARS • UNIO
 Analysis: TALOS+  • AnisoFIT  • MaxOcc  • iCing
 Structure Calculation: CS-ROSETTA  • CYANA  • UNIO  • Xplor-NIH
 Molecular Dynamics: AMBER  • GROMACS
 Modelling: 3D-DART  • HADDOCK
 Tools: Format Converter  • SHIFTX2  •  Antechamber  • PREDITOR   • RCI   • UPLABEL

Associated activities 
 Critical Assessment of Automated Structure Determination of Proteins from NMR Data (CASD-NMR ) is hosted by WeNMR. The first CASD-NMR paper, describing the results achieved in the 2009-2010 round, has been published in Structure.
 The WeNMR facilitated the creation of an archive of 9000+ validation reports on Protein Data Bank structures in NRG-CING.
 WeNMR closely collaborates with the ESFRI project Instruct  for Integrated structural biology

History 
The three-year WeNMR project started in November 2010 as the natural successor of the eNMR project. Financial support was provided by the European Community grants 213010 (eNMR) and 261572 (WeNMR) in the 7th Framework Programme (e-Infrastructure RI-261571).

Partners

References

External links
 The WeNMR VRC portal and website
 WeNMR in the EU FP7 CORDIS database 

Structural biology